The climate severity index ranges from 1 to 100. The score 1 is the least severe and 100 being the most severe. The climate severity index is a ratio between an observed climate indicator and a reference climate indicator.

References

Climate change assessment and attribution